Marjorie Garber (born June 11, 1944) is an American professor at Harvard University and the author of a wide variety of books, most notably ones about William Shakespeare and aspects of popular culture including  sexuality.

Biography
She wrote Vested Interests: Cross-Dressing and Cultural Anxiety, a ground breaking theoretical work on transvestitism's contribution to culture.  Other works include Sex and Real Estate: Why We Love Houses, Academic Instincts, Vice Versa: Bisexuality and the Eroticism of Everyday Life, Shakespeare After All, and Dog Love.

Her book Shakespeare After All (Pantheon, 2004) was chosen one of Newsweek′s ten best nonfiction books of the year,  and was awarded the 2005 Christian Gauss Book Award from Phi Beta Kappa.

She was educated at Swarthmore College (B.A., 1966; L.H.D., 2004 [honorary]) and Yale University (1969), writing her PhD on dreams in Shakespeare.

Selected bibliography

 
 Shakespeare's Ghost Writers: Literature as Uncanny Causality. Methuen Publishing. 2010.

References

External links 
 Marjorie Garber's home page
 Interview with Charlie Rose about Vice Versa

1944 births
Living people
American relationships and sexuality writers
20th-century American women writers
20th-century American non-fiction writers
American social sciences writers
Bisexual women
Harvard University faculty
Shakespearean scholars
Swarthmore College alumni
Yale University alumni
21st-century American women writers
American women non-fiction writers
21st-century American non-fiction writers
Members of the American Philosophical Society
American bisexual writers